This is a list of products formerly manufactured by Nortel, a defunct Canadian telecommunications manufacturer:
 1-Meg Modem
 Agile Communication Environment
 Nortel Application Server 5300
 Digital Multiplex System
 DMS-100
 Nortel ERS 5500
 Nortel ERS 8600
 Nortel IP Phone 1140E
 Nortel Meridian
 Meridian Mail
 Meridian Norstar
 Metro Ethernet Routing Switch 8600
 Multiservice Switch
 Nortel FAST Stacking
 Nortel Speech Server
 Nortel Optical Multiservice Edge 6500
 Passport Carrier Release
 Portable Commutator
 Nortel Secure Router 4134
 SP-1 switch

Nortel telephones
	Nortel IP Phone 1140E
	Nortel business phones
	Nortel payphones
	Northern Telecom home phones

Nortel products

Nortel products